Benjamin Boyd was the seventeenth intendent (mayor) of Charleston, South Carolina, serving one term in 1808. He was elected on July 22, 1808, to complete the term of John Dawson Jr., who had resigned. Boyd was the shortest serving mayor of Charleston; a regular election was held on September 12, 1808, at which his successor, William Rouse, was elected.

References

American people of Scottish descent
Mayors of Charleston, South Carolina
19th-century American politicians